The 1895 Yale Bulldogs football team was an American football team that represented Yale University as an independent during the 1895 college football season. The team finished with a 13–0–2 record, shut out 10 of 15 opponents, and outscored all opponents by a total of 316 to 38. John A. Hartwell was the head coach, and Sam Thorne was the team captain.

There was no contemporaneous system in 1895 for determining a national champion. However, Yale was retroactively named as the co-national champion by Parke H. Davis. Most selectors designated Penn (perfect 14–0 record) as the national champion for 1895; Yale and Penn did not play during the 1895 season.

Two Yale players were selected as consensus first-team players on the 1895 All-America team. The team's consensus All-Americans were: halfback Sam Thorne and tackle Fred T. Murphy.

Schedule

References

Yale
Yale Bulldogs football seasons
College football national champions
College football undefeated seasons
Yale Bulldogs football